Baker Towers (2005) is Jennifer Haigh's second novel. It depicts the rise and fall of a western Pennsylvania coal town in the years following World War II. It was a New York Times bestseller and won the 2006 L.L. Winship/PEN New England Award award for best book by a New England writer.

Reviews
The New York Times called the novel "capitvating" and "a living, breathing organism."

References

2005 American novels
Hemingway Foundation/PEN Award-winning works